Salash (also known as Kharārūd-e Bālā and Salash-e Kharārūd) is a village in Khara Rud Rural District, in the Central District of Siahkal County, Gilan Province, Iran. At the 2006 census, its population was 187, in 46 families.

References 

Populated places in Siahkal County